Benoît Maire (born 22 October 1978 in Pessac) is a French visual artist who works in film, sculpture, painting, photography, collage, and performance art. He is known for treating theory as an art form in its own right.

Biography
Benoît Maire studied visual art and philosophy at Michel de Montaigne University Bordeaux 3, at the Villa Arson in Nice, and at the Sorbonne where he began doctoral studies in philosophy, which he subsequently abandoned in 2006. He also did graduate work at Le Pavillon, Palais de Tokyo in Paris.

Solo exhibitions (selection)
 Spiaggia di Menzogne, Fondazione Giuliani, Rome, 2013
 Weapon, David Roberts Art Foundation, London, 2013
 Soon the metal between us will turn into gold, Kunsthalle Mulhouse, 2011
 Castling the Queen, Meessen De Clercq, Brussels, 2016.

Public collections (selection)
Maire’s work is included in public collections such as:
 Centre Georges Pompidou – Musée National d’Art Moderne, Paris
 FRAC Aquitaine, Bordeaux
 Kadist Art Fondation, Paris
 Nomas Fondation, Rome
 FRAC Île-de-France, Le Plateau, Paris
 David Roberts Art Foundation, London

Films (selection)
 Le Berger (The Shepherd), 2011
 L'Île de la répétition (Repetition Island), 2010

See also
 Conceptual art
 Aesthetics

References

External links
 Benoît Maire interviewed by Hans Ulrich Obrist.
 A review of Maire's work by Dan Fox in Frieze Magazine. 
 The artist's page on his German gallery's website, Croy Nielsen.
 Benoît Maire + Falke Pisano by Anthony Huberman, Blouin ARTINFO, 4 January 2009.
 Benoît Maire Artist Profile by Marie D'Elbée, This Is Tomorrow, 29 November 2011.
 An interview with Benoît Maire in Paris Art Magazine, 2 December 2010.

1978 births
Living people
French mixed-media artists
French contemporary artists